George J. Shopp (8 September 1834 – 24 March 1924) was a corporal in the United States Army who was awarded the Medal of Honor for gallantry at the Battle of Five Forks in Virginia during the American Civil War.

Personal life 
Shopp was born in the village of Dorst in Alsace, France on 8 September 1834. He immigrated to the United States at the age of 19 and worked on a farm for two years in Sullivan County, New York. He then purchased 50 acres of forest in Wayne County, Pennsylvania and married Mary Adaline Fish Shopp, fathering 6 children. He worked on his land as a lumberjack until May 1885, when the family moved westward, eventually settling in Yuma, Yuma County, Colorado in 1890. He moved to Denver in 1917 and wrote an autobiographical summary of his life in 1918. Shopp died on 24 March 1924 in Denver and was buried in Yuma Cemetery in Yuma.

Military service 
Shopp volunteered for the 6th Regiment, Pennsylvania Reserves on 10 May 1861 in Harrisburg, Pennsylvania. He was mustered into Company E of the 191st Pennsylvania Infantry on 13 May 1861 as a private and fought in the First and Second Battles of Bull Run. He was wounded at the Battle of South Mountain and was treated at a hospital in Frederick City, Maryland. He also fought at Chancellorsville, Arlington Heights, Gettysburg, Wilderness, Spotsylvania Court House, and several other battles in the eastern theatre. During this time, he was shot in the leg by a Confederate sharpshooter. He reenlisted in the Army on 12 February 1864 with veteran status. On 1 April 1865, during the Battle of Five Forks, Shopp captured a rebel flag under heavy fire and killed a Confederate officer. His Medal of Honor citation reads:

Shopp was promoted to corporal on 1 June 1865 and was mustered out of the Army on 28 June 1865 in Washington D.C.

References 

1834 births
1924 deaths
19th-century United States Army personnel
United States Army Medal of Honor recipients
American Civil War recipients of the Medal of Honor
People from Alsace
French-born Medal of Honor recipients